Jason Stanford is an American actor born  in the United States.

Stanford started his career in 1977 at age 24 while playing in Love Boat. In the 1980s, he began starring on popular television series like Dallas and Hunter.

In the 1990s, Stanford started making dubbing voices, such as the movie Highlander III: The Sorcerer and in 2000 the actor became committed to dubbing, performing such parts as the voice of Jerry in Totally Spies and that of Bugs Bunny in Baby Looney Tunes.

In 2007 Stanford returned to live action with the famous role of Brooks Chambers in the series Hitman, Despite her Killer. In 2008, however, he returned to doubling in Cloudy with a Chance of Meatballs.

Filmography 
 1977: The Love Boat - Season 1
 1978: The Love Boat - Season 2
 1979: Eight is Enough - Season 4
 1981: Eight is Enough - Season 5
 1983: The A-Team - Season 2
 1984: Dallas - Season 8
 1985: The Fall Guy - Season 5
 1988: Hunter - Season 5
 1990: Roseanne - Season 3
 1992: Murder, She Wrote - Season 9
 1994: Friends - Season 1
 1995: JAG - Season 1
 1995: Highlander III: The Sorcerer by Andrew Morahan
 1997-1998: Homicide: Life on the Street - Seasons 6 & 7
 1997: Pokémon, I Choose You (TV)
 1999: Beverly Hills 90210 - Season 10
 2000: Batman Beyond: Return of the Joker by Curt Geda
 2001-2006: Totally Spies - Seasons 1-5
 2002-2005: Baby Looney Tunes - Seasons 1 & 2
 2002: Kim Possible - Season 1
 2007-2008: Hitman, despite her killer - Season 1 & 2
 2009: Cloudy with a Chance of Meatballs (film) by Phil Lord and Chris Miller
 2010: Toy Story 3 by Lee Unkrich

External links 
  Jason Stanford in Allociné

1953 births
Living people
Place of birth missing (living people)
American male film actors
American male television actors
American male voice actors